The following lists events that happened during 1950 in Singapore.

Incumbents
 Governor: Sir Franklin Charles Gimson
 Colonial Secretary:
 Sir Patrick McKerron (till 29 April)
 Wilfred Lawson Blythe (starting 30 June)

Events

March
1 March - The Teachers’ Training College (present-day National Institute of Education) is formed to train teachers. It is the first-ever training college for teachers.
6 March - A new postal district system dividing Singapore into 28 districts is launched, making it the first ever system.

December
11–13 December - The Maria Hertogh riots took place a few days after the verdict, worsened by inflammatory news coverage. The riots left eighteen people dead and 173 injured.

Births
 17 February - Yu-Foo Yee Shoon, former politician.

See also
List of years in Singapore

References

 
Singapore
Years in Singapore